Fighting Scots may refer to the nickname of athletic teams of several United States high schools and colleges/universities, including:

Colleges/Universities
 The College of Wooster in Wooster, Ohio
 Edinboro University of Pennsylvania in Edinboro, Pennsylvania
 Gordon College, Massachusetts
 Monmouth College in Monmouth, Illinois
Macalester College in Saint Paul, Minnesota
 Alma College in Alma, Michigan
Ohio Valley University in Vienna, West Virginia

High schools
Caledonia High School in Caledonia, Michigan
Rim of the World High School in Lake Arrowhead, California

 Ben Lomond High School in Ogden, Utah

 Scotland County High School in Laurinburg, North Carolina